Hoogkerk is a town in the Dutch province of Groningen. It is located in the municipality of Groningen, about 4 km west of the city.

Hoogkerk was a separate municipality until 1969, when it was merged with the city of Groningen.

References

External links

Groningen (city)
Populated places in Groningen (province)
Former municipalities of Groningen (province)